Tomar-Tu  is a character appearing in media published by DC Comics, primarily in association with the Green Lantern Corps. He is a member of an extraterrestrial race called Xudarians, and is the son and successor of another Green Lantern Corps officer Tomar-Re. He first appeared in Green Lantern (vol. 3) #4 story titled "Among My Souvenirs". He became a Green Lantern in Green Lantern (vol. 3) #24 (May 1992) in a story titled  "The Decision". He was created by Gerard Jones.

Fictional character biography

Early years
The story of the Xudarian who would one day become the second Green Lantern of Xudar with the name "Tomar" began years before his birth when one of the guardians of the universe went mad. This renegade Guardian Appa Ali Apsa had made it his point of duty to capture entire cities from other planets. These captured cities were then incorporated into the planet Oa. The collection of these separate pieces of other worlds flung together became known as the Mosaic world. Tomar Tu originally came from one of the cities from Xudar, which was home world of his hero, the late Green Lantern Tomar-Re from Space Sector 2813. Tomar-Tu later discovered that his idol was also his father.

Despite the strangeness of their new surroundings the Xudarians persevered. Tomar was one of three Xudarians who ventured to a neighboring Earth town to seek out allies on this new world. Earthlings true to form attacked them on sight out of fear. When it seemed that the mob would have killed the three brave souls the mob was dispersed by Hal Jordan who was on his way to confront the mad guardian.

Tomar was instrumental in the fall of the mad guardian as he was contacted by Hal Jordan to monitor for the arrival of Guy Gardner who was to arrive from Earth to help Jordan deal with the mad guardian. When Gardner finally arrived Tomar gave Jordan the signal necessary for him to create a diversion and tap into the central power battery.

When Jordan's plan did not end with Appa Ali Apsa's defeat he punished the Xudarian's for their betrayal. His people suffered many losses and would have been totally eradicated if not for the timely arrival of the Guardians of the universe who had just returned from another dimension. Temporarily safe, the Xudarian's continued to defy their would-be master and mounted a defense for the Green Lanterns. During this climactic battle Hal Jordan was downed and would have been killed if Tomar Tu had not risked life and limb to save him. Hal Jordan, thankful for the assistance went on to defeat the mad guardian with the help of John Stewart, Guy Gardner and the Guardians of the Universe.

Realizing that return to Xudar was not forthcoming, Tomar and fellow Xudarians tried to promote unity between the races of the mosaic world. To this end Tomar lead a group of his kinsmen to the neighboring town from Earth. Once there they put forward the idea of an interspecies union. While there another human settlement was attacked by a neighboring race known as the horde. In their zeal to protect themselves some humans used this as a reason for anti-alien dogma. This led to further separation of the distinct species found on Oa. To prevent further violence John Stewart separated the Horde from the rest of the Mosaic world with stone walls.

Concerned about their neighbors Tomar and fellow Xudarians visited the human settlement only to be attacked by overzealous dogmatic humans. When the Xudarians heard of what had taken place they responded in kind. This led to their city being invaded by humans. Seeing no alternate way to deal with the problem John Stewart erected walls to separate all the settlements on the mosaic world to prevent further violence.

This was only temporary however as the walls were soon torn down and the different factions of the mosaic world went to war with each other. Luckily Hal Jordan and some other lanterns arrived in time to help Stewart separate the warring factions.  Stewart then imprisoned the leaders and instigators of the war. As an attempt to promote peace again, Tomar Tu and representatives from the other cities were brought together to help build the mosaic world in a way that all could benefit.

While the group discussed ways to ensure interdependence between the races their meeting was interrupted when John Stewart was contacted by Hal Jordan. Star Sapphire was again on the loose and an enraged John flew off to confront her despite Tomar's best efforts to stop him. During the battle Tomar and Kreon proved their worth and impressed Hal Jordan. When the conflict was over and Star Sapphire returned to her Carol Ferris state, Tomar Tu and Kreon where both invited to become Green Lanterns.

Green Lantern of Sector 2813
As a rookie Lantern he was trained by the strong but gentle Kilowog, who often regailed them with tales of great Green Lanterns from the past. His first recorded mission was to face the villain Eclipso who had taken control of Hal Jordan. While he and his fellow Lanterns fought bravely they were not able to free Jordan. They were soon called back to Oa as the planet was under attack from the Qwardians led by Guy Gardner. They were no match for their opponents as Hal Jordan and Kilowog were still on Earth and the unity required for them to hold the line was jeopardized by the bickering of Kreon and Boodikka. Luckily Gardner returned to their side once he had acquired the yellow power ring which once belonged to Sinestro.

His later missions as Green Lantern included a fight against Entropy. Despite the fact that he did not believe in the cause he was fighting for, he still stood by and protected his fellow Green Lanterns. Yet in another mission, he was called to the planet Maltus to aid Hal Jordan and the Green Lantern Corps against the Triarch. On the Guardians' homeworld, the Green Lanterns fought alternately against and alongside the L.E.G.I.O.N., and the Darkstars

Emerald Twilight and beyond

Tomar Tu's finale mission was the interception of Hal Jordan as he made his way to Oa. Tomar received transmissions as Hal Jordan paved a way to Oa by defeating Ke'Haan of Varva, General Kreon, Boodikka, Graf Toren, honor bound Laira and even rebellious Jack T. Chance. With each passing minute Tomar knew that the worst had happened; the greatest Green Lantern had turned renegade and was destroying the very corps he helped create. Tomar was no match for the more skilled Jordan and fell to his rage and might. He was then stripped of his ring and left for dead. As he drifted into what seemed to be oblivion all he could think was "kill Hal Jordan".

After his apparent death he, along with Tomar-Re and John Stewart, were honored by the remaining inhabitants of the Mosaic world. Statues were erected in their visage  and the story of the Xudarian seemed to come to an end.

After Hal Jordan had been resurrected and relieved from Parallax he returned to duty as Green Lantern of Earth. The corps also began to be rebuilt. Mysteriously he crash-landed in the middle of a ceremony involving Jordan and two other Air force pilots, Colonel Shane Sellers, and Captain Jillian Peralman. Jordan was visibly shaken when he realized that their unwelcome guest was Tomar Tu who he had "killed" years before.

Jordan returned the injured Lantern to Oa where he was checked on by the Green Lantern medical specialist, Soranik Natu. He remained in critical condition, all the while uttering "Kill. I will kill Hal Jordan". His return prompted Jordan and Gardner to check the Manhunter planet Biot for other missing lanterns. When the other Lost Lanterns were freed they revealed to Jordan and Gardner that Tomar had been held captive by the Manhunters, but had escaped to kill Jordan in revenge.

He was returned to active duty soon however and was seen with the other Lost Lanterns as they dined in the mess hall right before the Sinestro Corps attacked. Apparently he had not recovered fully from his injuries as he was the only Lost Lantern member to be seriously injured in the ensuing battle. He is then seen again aiding the Lost Lanterns sent to Qward to rescue Ion. He then joins Hal Jordan and Graf to rescue John Stewart and Guy Gardner.

When the Lanterns of Sector 2814 are shown the "Blackest Night", a Xudarian can be seen as part of the Sinestro Corps. This is not Tomar Tu but Romat-Ru who is considered one of the vilest creatures in the galaxy.

Following the war, Tomar-Tu was forced to testify against Laira, who had killed the Sinestro Corpsman Amon Sur in cold blood

Blackest Night
During the Blackest Night event, Tomar and the rest of the "Lost Lanterns" journeyed to Ysmault to recover the body of Laira, who had been inducted into the Red Lantern Corps and killed shortly after. While the group fended off the Red Lanterns' attack, black power rings descend on Ryut, reviving Laira as a Black Lantern. Laira then attacks her former friends, slashing Tomar across the chest.

DC Rebirth
Tomar-Tu is later imprisoned for intentionally and purposefully killing the Xudarian child murderer Romat-Ru. Tomar-Tu explains he felt he could not risk the murderer escaping to kill again. Tomar-Tu expresses regret for his actions but wonders why the Lanterns let any of their prisoners live. Despite his feelings, Tomar-Tu willing converses with yet another young Xudarian Green Lantern, Somar-Le. This Xudarian wonders why Tomar-Tu did what he did, as it conflicts with the heroic reputation the older Lantern has at home. Tomar-Tu's attitude gains the attention of the Controllers and the Darkstars. Tomar-Tu willingly accepts the mantle of the Darkstars and escapes, desiring to murder more killers like Romat-Ru.

In other media
 Tomar-Tu appears in Young Justice, voiced by Dee Bradley Baker.

See also
The Lost Lanterns
Laira
Kreon
Boodikka
Jack T. Chance
Graf Toren
Ke'Haan
Tomar-Re
List of Green Lanterns

References

External links
Book of Oa

Comics characters introduced in 1992
DC Comics aliens
DC Comics superheroes
Green Lantern Corps officers
DC Comics extraterrestrial superheroes